Aaron J. Ridley is an American atmospheric researcher and Professor at the University of Michigan. He is known for his works on magnetosphere-ionosphere coupling.
Ridley is a winner of NASA Group Achievement Award (2006).

See also
Cyclone Global Navigation Satellite System

References

External links
Ridley’s blog

Living people
American meteorologists
University of Michigan faculty
Eastern Michigan University alumni
University of Michigan alumni
Year of birth missing (living people)